is a passenger railway station  located in the town of Nichinan, Tottori Prefecture, Japan. It is operated by the West Japan Railway Company (JR West).

Lines

Station layout
The station consists of one ground-level side platform and one ground level island platform. The station building is connected with the island platform by a footbridge. The station is unattended.

Platforms

Adjacent stations

History
Shōyama Station opened on November 28, 1923. With the privatization of the Japan National Railways (JNR) on April 1, 1987, the station came under the aegis of the West Japan Railway Company.

Passenger statistics
In fiscal 2018, the station was used by an average of 194 passengers daily.

Surrounding area
 Japan National Route 183

See also
List of railway stations in Japan

References

External links 

 Shōyama Station from JR-Odekake.net 

Railway stations in Tottori Prefecture
Stations of West Japan Railway Company
Hakubi Line
Railway stations in Japan opened in 1923
Nichinan, Tottori